Lieutenant General William K. Hotchkiss (born January 8, 1943) is the retired Philippine Air Force general who served as the 24th Commanding General of the Philippine Air Force (PAF) and the former Director General of the Civil Aviation Authority of the Philippines. He is also the current President of the Cantilan Bank, a rural bank in Surigao del Sur.

He served various positions in preparation to the more demanding position in the PAF. He was a member of the famed Blue Diamonds, and a combat ready fighter and trainer pilot. On November 29, 1996, he became the Commanding General of the PAF. Further, in line with environmental protection, he is an ex officio member of the Philippine Eagle Foundation.

Military career
Hotchkiss joined the Philippine Air Force as cadet in Philippine Air Force Flying School in 1962 where he graduated in 1964. He became an instructor pilot after graduation.

In 1966, he joined the 5th Fighter Wing in Basa Air Base where he stayed for ten years and became a member of Elite Blue Diamonds of the Philippine Air Force. He flew 79 combat sorties against the enemies of the state at that time.

Over the years of dedicated service in the Philippine Air Force, he garnered several awards and decorations, in recognition of his professionalism and outstanding contribution and was assigned to different key sensitive positions up the ladder until he assumed position as the 24th Commanding General of the Philippine Air Force on November 29, 1996, until 1999.

Cantilan Bank
After his retirement in 1999, Hotchkiss joined the Cantilan Bank, a rural bank jointly founded by his father and sixteen other incorporators in 1980.

Now, it holds distinction as the most recognized rural bank in the country and the only community bank that is compliant with international standards.

Currently, Hotchkiss is the president and chairman of the board of Cantilan Bank.

CAAP Director General
On August 29, 2012, Hotchkiss was appointed as director general of the Civil Aviation Authority of the Philippines (CAAP), ending a two-month stint as a mere director and officer in charge of an agency vital to aviation reforms.

He is the former Director General of the Civil Aviation Authority of the Philippines. He is the current President of the Cantilan Bank, a rural bank in Surigao del Sur. He became the 24th commanding general of the Philippine Air Force (PAF).

He served various positions in preparation to the more demanding position in the PAF. He was a member of the famed Blue Diamonds, a combat ready pilot. On November 29, 1996, he became the Commanding General of the PAF. Further, in line with environmental protection, he is an ex officio member of the Philippine Eagle Foundation.

External links
Biography of “The Environmentalist” William K. Hotchkiss, from the Philippine Air Force website

Philippine Air Force generals
Filipino environmentalists
1943 births
Living people
People from Surigao del Sur